Library of Things is any collection of objects loaned, and any organization that practices such loaning. Objects often include kitchen appliances, tools, gardening equipment and seeds, electronics, toys and games, art, science kits, craft supplies, musical instruments, and recreational equipment. Especially appropriate are objects that are useful occasionally but cumbersome to store, such as specialized cookware or niche technology items.  Collections vary widely, but go far beyond the books, journals, and media that have been the primary focus of traditional libraries.

The Library of Things movement is a growing trend in public, academic and special libraries in many countries. There are also free-standing organizations separate from libraries, such as tool libraries, toy libraries, community sharing centers, independent non-profits, and individual initiatives. The Share Shed (Totnes, UK) is developing the first mobile Library of Things. Collections are often supported by educational programming and public events. These borrowing centers and library collections are part of the sharing economy.

Types of collections

Arts and crafts 
Art rentals are being made available for library patrons for borrowing prints, posters, paintings, and other visual art. Additionally, many Library of Things are adding arts and crafts equipment and supplies for use in the library or for check out. Crafting tools may include sewing machines, knitting kits, die-cutters, papercraft tools, jewelry repair and embroidery kits, scrapbooking supplies, and button makers.

Electronics and technology 
Libraries have been lending electronics like e-readers, tablets, and laptops for quite some time already, but are now expanding the range of electronics that they lend through the Library of Things. Electronics offerings have expanded to include mobile hot spots, projectors, scanners, GoPros, graphics tablets, digital and film cameras, video games, converters (vinyl, cassette, and VHS to digital files), green screens, and video cameras.

Musical instruments 
Instrument collections have been brought in to libraries, often accompanied by sheet music, tuners, amps, and educational resources. The Free Library of Philadelphia launched its Musical Instrument Collection (MIC) in 2016, and lending includes an electric guitar, mandolin, electric bass, ukulele, acoustic-electric guitar, and a banjo. Lopez Island Library introduced a musical instrument "petting zoo", which includes instruments like acoustic and electric guitars, banjo, cello, clarinet, flugelhorn, French horn, electric keyboard, recorder, ukulele, viola and violin. The JCLS library of things even has a table top electric drum set and a Kalimba thumb piano.

Kitchen equipment 
Specialized kitchen equipment, including food dehydrators, popcorn machines, ice cream makers, specialized blenders, and cake pans are available to borrow for home use. Also kitchen items like air fryers, instant pots and Kitchen Aid blenders. Cake pans and novelty bakeware have been particularly popular additions to libraries, with many stand-alone collections being created.

Gardening and seed libraries 
Seed libraries have cropped up as a part of public library collections. Many have a policy for users who "check out" seeds for a growing season; they agree to plant the checked-out seeds and then save seeds from the yield to return to the collection for the following year. Some seed libraries have become a point of contention with state governments' agriculture departments. Agricultural equipment, landscaping tools, and gardening supplies are also included in 'things' collections, and may include rakes, hedge trimmers, pruners, hand tools, leaf blowers, and lawn mowers. Some libraries are even creating community gardens where library users can check out a garden plot for a growing season.

Home tools 
Home monitoring tools are increasingly available in concert with other tools in Library of Things collections. Thermal cameras and leak detectors, air quality meters, infrared thermometers, energy meters, and other monitoring devices are being made available for check out.

Recreation 
Some libraries are bringing in equipment to help users enjoy outdoor recreation, sometimes in partnership with local Parks and Recreation departments. Among a wide range of recreation equipment offerings are fishing rods, frisbees and whiffle balls, bird watching kits and croquet, badminton, bocce or pickleball sets.

Similarly, libraries are checking out party supplies for social recreation, including items like bubble, cotton candy, and karaoke machines, chocolate fountains, or boomboxes.

Science and maker 
The Maker movement has had an influence on the collections available at Libraries of Things, and as a result there are littleBits, Arduino, Makey Makey, Raspberry Pi, robotics kits, coding toys, 3D printers and vinyl and laser cutters may be available for check out at many libraries. Similarly, science tools like digital microscopes, telescopes, light meters and themed science kits are being made available to borrow.

Tools 
Tool libraries have gained popularity as free-standing borrowing centers in many cities, and libraries are also bringing in tool collections for borrowing. Hand and power tools for home improvement, construction and fine woodworking are popular additions to libraries, and often are accompanied by programming and educational opportunities.

Toys 
Toy lending centers have a longer history, stretching back to the Great Depression. Recently, though, libraries have come to embrace the concept of toy libraries, and have introduced lending collections of puppets, board games, American Girl dolls, puzzles, blocks and a wide variety of other toys into their collections.

Other 
The Library of Things movement is expanding to include an ever-widening array of items. Objects include tiebraries, taxidermied animals, museum passes, or Santa Claus suits. Palm Harbor Public Library in Florida has a collection for role playing games such as Dungeons and Dragons (the Mark Mazurek Role Playing Game Collections).

List of organizations

Traditional libraries 
 Allen County Public Library - Fort Wayne, Indiana, United States
 Altadena Libraries - Altadena, California, United States
Ann Arbor District Library - Ann Arbor, Michigan, United States
Banff Public Library - Banff, Alberta, Canada
 Bangor Public Library - Bangor, Maine, United States
 Berkeley Public Library - Berkeley, California, United States
 Beaverton City Library - Beaverton, Oregon, United States
 Boston Public Library - Boston, Massachusetts, United States
 Bremen City Library  - Bremen, Germany
Bridges Library System - Waukesha County, Wisconsin and Jefferson County, Wisconsin, United States
 Brookline Public Library - Brookline, Massachusetts, United States
 Capital Area District Libraries - Michigan, United States
 Cary Memorial Library - Lexington, Massachusetts, United States
 County of San Luis Obispo Public Libraries - San Luis Obispo County, California, United States
 Charles M. Bailey Public Library - Winthrop, Maine, United States
 Curtis Memorial Library - Brunswick, Maine, United States
 Deerfield Public Library - Deerfield, Illinois, United States
 Denver Public Library - Denver, Colorado, United States
 Dover Town Library - Dover, Massachusetts, United States
 Elmhurst Public Library - Elmhurst, Illinois, United States
 Fort Vancouver Regional Libraries - Washougal, Washington, United States
 Glencoe Public Library - Glencoe, Illinois, United States
 Glenview Public Library - Glenview, Illinois, United States
 Hartford Public Library - Hartford, Connecticut, United States
 Highland Park Public Library - Highland Park, Illinois, United States
 Hillsboro Public Library - Hillsboro, Oregon, United States
 Jackson County Library Services - Oregon, United States
 Keene Public Library - Keene, New Hampshire, United States
 Kitchener Public Library - Kitchener, Ontario, Canada
 Kitsap Regional Library - Kitsap County, Washington, United States
 La Grange Park Public Library - La Grange Park, Illinois, United States
 Lake Forest Library - Lake Forest, Illinois, United States
 Lincolnwood Public Library District - Lincolnwood, Illinois, United States
 Livingston Public Library - Livingston, New Jersey, United States
 Maitland Public Library - Maitland, Florida, United States
 Matteson Area Public Library District - Matteson, Illinois, United States
 Mesa Public Library - Mesa, Arizona, United States
 Niles-Maine District Library - Niles, Illinois, United States
 Pasadena Public Library - Pasadena, California, United States
 Pinellas Public Library Cooperative - Clearwater, Florida, United States
 Reading Public Library - Reading, Massachusetts, United States
 Richland Library - Richland County, South Carolina, United States
 Robbins Library - Arlington, Massachusetts, United States
 Sacramento Public Library - Sacramento, California, United States
 Skokie Public Library - Skokie, Illinois, United States
 Somerville Public Library - Somerville, Massachusetts, United States
 Springvale Public Library - Maine, United States
 St. Charles Public Library - St. Charles, Illinois, United States
 Sweetwater Public Library - Sweetwater, Tennessee, United States
 Telluride Public Library - Telluride, Colorado, United States
 Waterloo Public Library - Waterloo, Ontario, Canada
 Watertown Free Public Library - Watertown, Massachusetts, United States
 Washington-Centerville Public Library - Centerville, Ohio, United States
 Wayland Free Public Library - Wayland, Massachusetts, United States
 West Chicago Public Library - West Chicago, Illinois, United States
 Wilmette Public Library - Wilmette, Illinois, United States
 Winnetka-Northfield Public Library District - Winnetka, Illinois, United States

Free-standing 
 allerleih e.V.- Kassel, Germany
Belfast Tool Library - Belfast, Northern Ireland
Benthyg - Cardiff, Wales
 Bibliothek der Dinge / Knižnica vecí - Goethe-Institut, Bratislava, Slovakia
Leihbar Bonn / Bonn, Germany www.leihbarbonn.de
Borrow Don't Buy - Plymouth, England
 Brunswick Tool Library - Melbourne, Australia
The Chicago Tool Library - Chicago, Illinois, United States
 De Spullenier - Utrecht, Netherlands
 Edmonton Tool Library - Edmonton, Canada
Edinburgh Tool Library - Edinburgh, Scotland
Glasgow Tool Library - Glasgow, Scotland
 Halifax Tool Library - Halifax, Canada
Hull Library of Things - Hull, East Riding of Yorkshire, England
 Knjižnica REČI - Ljubljana, Slovenia
 La Manivelle - Geneva, Switzerland
 La Manivelle - Lausanne, Switzerland
 Leihbar - Bonn, Germany
 LEIHOTHEK - Münster, Germany
 Leila - Berlin, Germany
 Leila - Leipzig, Germany
 Leihlager - Basel, Switzerland
 Library of Things - Prague, Czech Republic
 Knihovna věcí Brno - Brno, Czech Republic
 Library of Things - Saskatoon, Saskatchewan
 Library of Things - Kitchener, Ontario
 LUULA - Heidelberg, Germany
 Northeast Seattle Tool Library - Seattle, WA
 Santa Rosa Tool Library - California, United States
 Sharing Depot - Toronto, Ontario
 SHARE:Frome - A Library of Things - Somerset, UK
 SHARE:Oxford - Oxford, UK
 Share Shed - Brisbane, Australia
 Station North Tool Library - Baltimore, Maryland, United States
 Sydney Library of Things - Sydney, Australia
 Tool Library - Buffalo, United States
 Toronto Tool Library - Toronto, ON, Canada 
 Vancouver Tool Library - Vancouver, BC, Canada 
 West Philly Tool Library - Philadelphia, PA
 West Seattle Tool Library - Seattle, WA

References 

Libraries by type
Types of library